Shahar Biran (born 13 September 1998) is an Israeli tennis player.

Biran has a career-high WTA singles ranking of 805, achieved on August 5, 2019. Her career-high WTA doubles ranking of 793, was achieved on August 5, 2019.

Biography
Biran's hometown is Hod HaSharon, Israel.

She plays tennis for Old Dominion University in Norfolk, Virginia. In June 2020 Biran was named Conference USA Singles Second Team and Doubles Second Team after a spring season in which she was 7-0 in singles and 7-3 in doubles.

Biran made her Fed Cup debut for Israel in 2019.

References

External links
 
 
 

1998 births
Living people
People from Hod HaSharon
Israeli female tennis players
Old Dominion Monarchs athletes
College women's tennis players in the United States